Master Inayat Hussain (Punjabi, ; 1916 – 26 March 1993) was a Pakistani film music composer.

Early life and career
Inayat Hussain was born in the Bhati Gate area of Lahore in 1916.  He also lived in the Lohari Gate, Lahore area in the mid-1980s. After receiving some basic education, he became a formal student of Ustad Bade Ghulam Ali Khan of Patiala gharana for learning the traditional classical music. He learned to play harmonium and other musical instruments in his youth. In the early part of his career, he worked in several theatrical organisations in Calcutta and Bombay in British India, both as a singer and as an actor. Having won some recognition in the music world, he worked as a Court Singer to the Nawab of Rampur for a short time.

Later, for nine years, he worked as a music composer for Columbia Gramophone Recording Company and for His Master's Voice music labels. He also had the opportunity to work with the then renowned singers Roshan Ara Begum, Zeenat Begum and Malika Pukhraj.

He composed music for nearly 65 films starting with a Punjabi language film Kamli (1946) before independence of Pakistan in 1947. His first film in Pakistan was Hichkolay (1949). In 1950, he got a breakthrough with his first super-hit song in film Shammi (1950) which was produced by the famous ghazal singer Malika Pukhraj. Next opportunity for recognition came with the popularity of a song in film Gumnaam (1954) that was written by Saifuddin Saif, Payal Mein Geet Hain Chhumm Chhumm Ke. And the next year in 1955, he even got attention from a highly-recognized personality in the Indian subcontinent in the field of classical music Amir Khan who made a special stopover in Lahore on his way back from his scheduled Afghanistan tour, just to meet him in Lahore and compliment him in person for composing the film song Ulfat Ki Nai Manzil Ko Chala for Anwar Kamal Pasha's film Qatil (1955), lyrics written by Qateel Shifai and skillfully sung by Iqbal Bano under his music direction.

It was quite an achievement having recognition from an authority in the music field for an aspiring newcomer. No looking back for him after that, he ended up becoming an innovative leading film composer of Pakistan and composed music for nearly 65 films from 1949 to 1985.

Popular hit songs
All the songs listed below had music by Master Inayat Hussain:

Music as a family tradition
Master Inayat Hussain had two younger brothers –  Master Abdullah (1930 – 31 January 1994) who was also a noted film music composer in Pakistan and then the youngest brother Akhtar Hussain Akhiyan of Punjabi hit film Paatay Khan (1955) fame. In fact, Master Inayat Hussain came from a family with a strong music tradition called 'Mozang Gharana' that also included a cousin and another Pakistani film music composer, Ustad Tafu. One of his nephews M. Ashraf (1 February 1942 – 4 February 2007) also was a highly successful film music composer from the 1960s to the 1990s.

Awards and recognition
 Nigar Award for Best Music in film Naila (1965)
 Nigar Award for Best Music in Punjabi-language film Jadoo (1975)

Death
Inayat Hussain died on 26 March 1993 at age 76 at his hometown, Lahore, Pakistan.

References

External links

1916 births
1993 deaths
Nigar Award winners
Pakistani film score composers
Musicians from Lahore
Punjabi people